"Physical Funk" is a song written, performed and produced by American rapper Domino. It was released on February 6, 1996 through Outburst Records as the lead single from his second studio album Physical Funk.

"Physical Funk" became Domino's final single to reach the Billboard Hot 100, peaking at #87, though it found better success on the Hot Rap Singles where it peaked at 11.

A promotional music video was released for the song that featured Domino parodying Sir Mix-a-Lot's "Baby Got Back", Tone Lōc's "Wild Thing", Michael and Janet Jackson's "Scream" and Coolio's "Fantastic Voyage".

Track listing

A-Side
"Physical Funk" (Radio Edit)
"Physical Funk" (Instrumental)

B-Side
"Physical Funk" (LP Mix)
"Do You Qualify?"
"Physical Funk" (Acapella)

Charts

References

External links

1995 songs
1996 singles
Domino (rapper) songs